Sovereignty and Its Other: Toward the Dejustification of Violence is a book-length study of sovereignty and its relation with violence by Dimitris Vardoulakis.

References

External links 
 Sovereignty and Its Other
 Was Donald Trump Elected Because He Is Laughable?
 Not life, but bad literature, Dimitris Vardoulakis, New Philosopher, May 27, 2013

2013 non-fiction books
Fordham University Press books
Books about violence
Philosophy books
Books about democracy
Books about revolutions
Books about sovereignty